WAXQ (104.3 FM) is a classic rock-formatted radio station licensed to New York City. WAXQ is owned by iHeartMedia and broadcasts from studios in the former AT&T Building in the Tribeca neighborhood of Manhattan; its transmitter is located at the Empire State Building.

History

WFDR (1949–1952)
The 104.3 frequency originally signed on in 1949 as WFDR, a nonprofit station owned by the International Ladies' Garment Workers' Union. However, like most early FM stations, WFDR lost money, and the station ceased operations in 1952.

WNCN and WQIV (1956–1993)
The FM station first took to the air on December 1, 1956, as WFMX, and within a year adopted the call letters WNCN (for New York Concert Network). As such, it was a part of a group of classical music stations in the northeastern United States, the Concert Network, programmed from WBCN in Boston and carried by affiliates including WXCN in Providence, Rhode Island and WHCN in Hartford, Connecticut. Later, WNCN was acquired by medical ad agency owner Ludwig Wolfgang Frohlich, the founder of the National Science Network, and added daily medical news reports to the schedule, since it was believed that classical music was the choice of the medical and dental professions. It also moved the antenna from the Hotel Pierre to the Empire State Building, increasing the station's coverage. National Science sold the station to Starr Broadcast Group in 1974. The station would retain a classical music format for many years, except for a short period during 1974–1975 when it took up a rock format with the call letters WQIV. During the brief run of WQIV, the station's progressive album-oriented rock appealed to long-time WNEW-FM listeners and included some veteran 70s FM rock DJs including Rosko and Carol Miller. This brief period also saw deployment of a short-lived technology as unintentionally brief as the format change itself:  WQIV broadcast in Quadraphonic sound (a precursor to "Surround Sound") as indicated by the new call letters "Q" (quadraphonic) "IV" (Roman numeral 4).  This choice of call letters was a constant reminder to audiences of this technical innovation, although history shows that the free market quickly abandoned quad.

The WQIV era was during ownership by Starr Broadcast Group, of which William F. Buckley Jr. was chairman. The GM was Alan Eisenberg, and the program director was Larry Miller (WKTU). The announcement that the station was changing to rock music was read by Mr. Buckley himself and repeated frequently on the air. Two groups, the WNCN Listeners Guild and Classical Radio for Connecticut, were formed, and petitioned the FCC to forbid the change. A last minute stay by a Supreme Court Justice delayed the scheduled changeover, but that was lifted and WNCN became WQIV. The first selection played on the air by program and music director Larry Miller after the changeover was Electric Light Orchestra's "Roll Over Beethoven". William Buckley admitted he loved classical music, but had a responsibility to Starr shareholders to maximize returns. The Listeners Guild continued its fight, and eventually forced a change back to classical music when an application was filed for the frequency by a new group headed by William Benton of the Encyclopædia Britannica. Starr relented, and in a negotiated settlement, sold the station to GAF Broadcasting. WQIV signed off with "Funeral for a Friend" by Elton John. The station then played the last 2 notes of the last classical song on the original WNCN that were cut off, then said "sorry for the interruption". The first selection played on the air after the change back was from Bach's B-minor Mass, "Et resurrexit".  From 1971 to 1974 and again from 1975 to 1994, David Dubal served as music director of WNCN. 

The station was owned by GAF until 1996, when Viacom purchased it for $100 million.

WAXQ (1993–present)
On December 18, 1993, at Midnight, WNCN signed off for good with Joseph Hadyn's Symphony No. 45 (also known as the "Farewell Symphony") as the station adopted a current-based album-oriented rock (AOR) format, along with new call letters WAXQ and the branding "Q104.3". The first on-air staff was Trent Tyler and Christine Nagy in morning drive; Heidi Hess in middays; Ida Hakkila and Mark Razz in afternoon drive; Candy Martin (Candice Agree) in nights and Lark Logan, overnights. The station's first PD was Bob Elliot, who was replaced by Ron Valeri. The APD/MD for Q104.3's entire existence as a hard rock station was Vinny Marino. The playlist was split into 5-song blocks that focused on current hard rock favorites, but also mixed in classic rock tunes and cuts from bands not typically thought of as radio friendly (Type O Negative, Anthrax). However, ratings were low, as this format was not ideal during a time in which more people were listening to alternative rock than to heavy metal. Also, during the mid-1990s, other New York City radio stations were playing alternative rock music, as WXRK went from classic rock to alternative rock, and WNEW-FM was trying to go after a younger audience.

In 1996, thanks to a deal involving a swapping of various broadcast stations, Viacom would acquire WAXQ. After initial consideration was given for the station to turn to a country format, management decided that there was a need for a full-time classic rock station in New York City. As a result, the station went to its current format at 5 a.m. on July 1, 1996. Research indicated that if WNEW were to revert to an all-classic rock format, listeners would not return there due to the distrust for that station. As it turned out, WNEW would unsuccessfully go back to a classic rock format in January 1997.

That same year, Viacom sold off its entire radio division (before its merger with CBS and Infinity) to Chancellor Media. Chancellor, in turn, merged with Capstar Broadcasting to form AMFM; that company was then purchased by Clear Channel Communications.

The Sopranos often featured the station as the radio station Tony Soprano would set on his alarm clock. In sharp contrast to their respective tenures on other New York area radio stations, the DJs now have little creative input into what music gets played, as is common nowadays at most major-market radio stations. The playlist is narrower than that of classic rock radio stations of the past, due to results from audience research, and songs that were once staples of classic rock radio, such as "Eight Miles High" by The Byrds, are now only played during infrequent segments devoted to "Deep Classics". WAXQ is also known to go outside the genre of strictly classic rock, sometimes playing more modern rock, such as the Red Hot Chili Peppers and Stone Temple Pilots, as well as some classic pop music such as by Elton John and Phil Collins and even some newer heavy metal such as Queensrÿche and Metallica, that are not normally found on classic rock stations.

HD operations 
Like other Clear Channel stations, WAXQ began multicasting in late winter 2006. On WAXQ-HD1, the classic rock format could be heard on the original analog station, while WAXQ-HD2 played a blend of deep classic rock hits including some more hard rock and current releases by classic rock artists. HD stations can only be received with an HD Radio, which receive both the primary analog station, the duplicate HD Feed and the multicasting feeds. Stations can put as many as three sets of HD programming on one dial position plus their original analog broadcast. With the demise of "K-Rock" on WXRK in early 2009, the HD2 channel began airing "Rock Nation" to satisfy the fans of K-Rock's active rock format. On July 16, 2011, one day after alternative station 101.9 RXP flipped formats, the HD2 channel became "The Alternative Project" to somewhat fill the gap of alternative rock. As of August 2011, the HD2 channel played a mix of mostly active rock, mixed with 90's alternative hard rock. Although the station ID at the top of the hour stated "The Alternative Project", it was neither airing "Rock Nation" nor "The Alternative Project". Two weeks later in mid-August 2011, "The Alternative Project" feed returned. On October 1, 2015, HD2 became "iHeart Country" with a country music format. However, sometime in 2017, the HD2 country format was replaced by a simulcast of sister station WOR.

"The Alternative Project" would later return in 2018, but this time on the new HD3 subchannel, despite having competition from rival alternative station WNYL. The HD3 sub-channel has since been discontinued.

References

External links 
 

 

1956 establishments in New York City
Classic rock radio stations in the United States
AXQ
Radio stations established in 1956
IHeartMedia radio stations